Boston Legal  is an American legal drama and comedy drama television series created by former lawyer and Boston native David E. Kelley, produced in association with 20th Century Fox Television for ABC. The series aired from October 3, 2004, to December 8, 2008. The series stars James Spader, William Shatner and Candice Bergen. It is a direct spin-off and continuation of the TV series The Practice, with several characters from the eighth season of that series moving to Boston Legal. While never a Nielsen ratings smash hit, the show was critically acclaimed, receiving 26 Primetime Emmy Awards nominations, including for Outstanding Drama Series in 2007 and 2008.

Plot 
Boston Legal follows the exploits of former Practice character Alan Shore, and his passionate co-workers, at the fictional offices of Crane, Poole & Schmidt. The high-end litigation firm, based in Boston, handles both civil and criminal law cases.

The series plays on the chemistry between smarmy Shore and loose cannon Denny Crane. Middle-aged Shore is wry and wily, while mid-70s Crane (suffering from early dementia) is flamboyant and eccentric. Shore often uses questionable methods to win cases. Crane is obsessed with the reputation of his name, which he frequently repeats. Though political opposites, Shore and Crane are best friends. Episodes more often than not end with the two relaxing and musing together on the firm's balcony (while they smoke cigars and sip scotch whisky).

Cast

The Practice characters 
 James Spader as Alan Shore (The Practice season 8; seasons 1–5)
 William Shatner as Denny Crane (The Practice season 8; seasons 1–5)
 Rhona Mitra as Tara Wilson (The Practice season 8; season 1; recurring season 2)
 Lake Bell as Sally Heep (The Practice season 8; season 1; guest season 3)

Main characters 
 Mark Valley as Brad Chase (seasons 1–3; recurring season 4)
 Monica Potter as Lori Colson (season 1; recurring season 2)
 Candice Bergen as Shirley Schmidt (seasons 1–5, starting with episode 11)
 René Auberjonois as Paul Lewiston (seasons 1–3; recurring season 4–5)
 Julie Bowen as Denise Bauer (seasons 2–3; guest season 5)
 Ryan Michelle Bathe as Sara Holt (season 2)
 Justin Mentell as Garrett Wells (season 2)
 Constance Zimmer as Claire Simms (season 3)
 Craig Bierko as Jeffrey Coho (season 3)
 Gary Anthony Williams as Clarence Bell (seasons 3–4)
 Christian Clemenson as Jerry Espenson (seasons 4–5; recurring season 2–3)
 Taraji P. Henson as Whitney Rome (season 4)
 Saffron Burrows as Lorraine Weller (season 4)
 Tara Summers as Katie Lloyd (seasons 4–5)
 John Larroquette as Carl Sack (seasons 4–5)

Production 
Prior to the show's premiere, it had a working title of Fleet Street, an allusion to the real street in Boston where the fictitious Crane, Poole & Schmidt had its offices. The working title was later modified to The Practice: Fleet Street, but this title was dropped in favor of Boston Legal. The real building shown as the law office is located at 500 Boylston Street, 1.4 miles away from Fleet Street.

The American producers of the series also hired the British writer and barrister John Mortimer (creator of the UK legal series Rumpole of the Bailey) as a consultant for Boston Legal.

The show's pilot was originally produced with former The Practice stars James Spader and Rhona Mitra, guest stars William Shatner and Lake Bell. It featured an expanded storyline with Larry Miller as Edwin Poole, Mark Valley as Brad Chase and John Michael Higgins as senior partner Jerry Austin. Monica Potter was later cast as junior partner Lori Colson and René Auberjonois as senior partner Paul Lewiston, replacing John Michael Higgins. The pilot premiered on ABC on October 3, 2004.

On November 30, 2004, it was announced that Candice Bergen would join the cast as senior partner Shirley Schmidt, a character the producers had planned to introduce for several months.  Lake Bell left the series mid-season, and René Auberjonois was promoted to main cast member. Anthony Heald and Betty White also made regular guest appearances, having both appeared as the same characters on The Practice.

On April 5, 2005, the series was renewed for a second season, although ABC put the show on hiatus in favor of Grey's Anatomy  The success of Grey's Anatomy placed Boston Legal on hold until autumn 2005, when it returned for an extended season of 27 episodes. Both Rhona Mitra and Monica Potter left the series during the hiatus, while Julie Bowen was cast as Denise Bauer. Ryan Michelle Bathe and Justin Mentell were later cast as junior associates Sara Holt and Garrett Wells. The second episode of season 3 introduced Craig Bierko as Jeffrey Coho and Constance Zimmer as Claire Simms. In episode 11, guest star Gary Anthony Williams joined the cast, with Craig Bierko leaving in episode 15.

On June 4, 2007, TV Guide announced that René Auberjonois, Julie Bowen, Mark Valley and Constance Zimmer would not return for season 4. On June 13, 2007, it was announced that actor John Larroquette (former The Practice guest star) would join the cast as a senior partner transferred from the New York offices of Crane, Poole & Schmidt, with actress Tara Summers joining as a young associate. Christian Clemenson (former The Practice guest star), who had guest-starred occasionally as Jerry Espenson (a brilliant but socially inept lawyer), was promoted to main cast. Production also stated that René Auberjonois, Mark Valley, Julie Bowen, and Constance Zimmer may return in guest roles. On July 2, 2007, it was reported that both René Auberjonois and Mark Valley would return in recurring roles; It was also announced that Taraji P. Henson would join the cast in season 4, with Saffron Burrows appearing in a recurring role. Burrows later became a full-time cast member.

On May 13, 2008, ABC announced that Boston Legal would return for a fifth and final season in the fall. Saffron Burrows did not return as a series regular, having joined the cast of My Own Worst Enemy. The final season consisted of 13 episodes to reach the "100" episode mark, which facilitated successful syndication. There was speculation that Boston Legal might receive an additional episode order, if the show had another strong showing in the Emmy Awards and produced solid ratings in its new fall time slot. The season began airing on September 22, 2008.

On June 18 and June 20, 2008 it was reported that Gary Anthony Williams and Taraji P. Henson would not return for season 5 as Clarence Bell and Whitney Rome, respectively. On July 17, 2008, Boston Legal was nominated for a series-high seven Emmy nominations, including for Best Drama Series for the second consecutive year. Spader, Bergen and Shatner were each nominated for their respective roles.

Boston Legal'''s two-hour-long series finale aired on Monday, December 8, 2008 at 9:00PM Eastern/8:00PM Central. David E. Kelley stated in an interview with the Pittsburgh Post-Gazette on December 7, 2008 that it was ABC's decision to end Boston Legal, and that he "had to fight to bring it back for a short season of 13 episodes".

The show was noted for frequently breaking the fourth wall throughout its run.

 Episodes 

 Reception 
 Ratings and audience profile 
According to Nielsen Media Research, Boston Legal drew the richest viewing audience on television, based on the concentration of high-income viewers in its young adult audience (Adult 18–49 index w/$100k+ annual income).

Seasonal rankings (based on average total viewers per episode) of Boston Legal on ABC.Note: Each U.S. network television season starts in late September and ends in late May, which coincides with the completion of May sweeps. All times mentioned in this section were in the Eastern and Pacific time zones.Awards

Primetime Emmy Awards:
2005 Award for Outstanding Lead Actor in a Drama Series (James Spader)
2005 Award for Outstanding Supporting Actor in a Drama Series (William Shatner)
2006 Award for Outstanding Guest Actor in a Drama Series (Christian Clemenson)
2007 Award for Outstanding Lead Actor in a Drama Series (James Spader)
James Spader also won the 2004 Award for Outstanding Lead Actor in a Drama Series for the same role on The Practice.
William Shatner also won the 2004 Outstanding Guest Actor in a Drama Series for the same role on The Practice''.

Golden Globe Awards:
2004 Award for Best Supporting Actor in a Series, Miniseries, or TV Movie (William Shatner)

Peabody Awards
2005, as David E. Kelley Productions, in association with 20th Century Fox Television

Home media 

As a former ABC series, the show is available for streaming on Disney platform Hulu.

References

External links 

 
 
 

 
2000s American comedy-drama television series
2000s American workplace comedy television series
2000s American workplace drama television series
2004 American television series debuts
2008 American television series endings
American Broadcasting Company original programming
2000s American legal television series
American television spin-offs
English-language television shows
Peabody Award-winning television programs
The Practice
Primetime Emmy Award-winning television series
Television series by 20th Century Fox Television
Television series created by David E. Kelley
Television shows set in Boston
Television Academy Honors winners